Aurelia Paulina was a local prominent noblewoman in Anatolia who lived in the 2nd century and perhaps in the 3rd century in the Roman Empire. She was a contemporary to the rule of Roman Emperor Commodus (reigned 180–192) and the Severan dynasty.

Paulina originated from a wealthy family, although not of Senatorial rank from the province of Syria. She emigrated to Perga the capital of the Roman province of Pamphylia in Anatolia. Paulina married an Anatolian noble called Aquilus from Sillyon. Sometime after, Paulina and Aquilus received Roman citizenship from Commodus, thus receiving and adding the name Aurelius to their names.

According to surviving inscriptions, it is understood that Paulina held the offices of priestess of the Goddess Artemis in Perga. Artemis was the most important Goddess in Perga. Aquilus with Paulina shared the title of as priest and priestess of the imperial cult in Perga. Inspired by the former benefactions of Plancia Magna and her family, Paulina donated to Perga a trapezoidal courtyard outside the southern city gate, constructing a large monumental nymphaeum (a monumental fountain, not much remains of the monument). The monumental fountain was originally an ancient well. Inscriptions reveal that Aurelia Paulina constructed and decorated the nymphaeum.

Paulina dedicated the nymphaeum to Artemis and the reigning Roman Emperor Lucius Septimius Severus (reigned 193–211); his wife Roman Empress Julia Domna and their sons: Lucius Septimius Bassianus (Caracalla) and Publius Septimius Geta and other relatives of Julia Domna. After the nymphaeum, stand life size statues of three women. One of these statues may represent Paulina, but a fragment of the head survives.

An extant statue survives of Paulina. She is shown in Syrian dress; wearing heavy jewelry covering her chest and her long chain ending in a large shell pendant which is associated with Artemis. The extant dress of Paulina in this statue is a typical female portrait of Syrian women from this period and perhaps Paulina wants to emphasize her links with Julia Domna, who was Syrian.

Over the large arch of the nymphaeum, there is a pediment with a relief of a distinctively feminine symbolism depicting the deities Eros, Artemis and Dionysus. Between the three deities depicts a priestess with a large shell pendant, perhaps resembling Paulina. Paulina commissioning to build the nymphaeum, donating a statue of her near the baths and her religious participations had brought to herself and her family great blessings and great honor to Perga, her native homeland and the Severan dynasty.

References

Sources
 Plancia Magna, Aurelia Paulina, and Regilla: Civic Donors, Vroma.org, Barbara F. McManus

People of Roman Syria
2nd-century Romans
2nd-century Roman women
Priestesses of the Roman Empire
2nd-century clergy
Year of birth unknown
Year of death unknown
2nd-century people